Kuldeep Kumar is an Indian Politician from Bhartiya Janata Party currently serving as the Vice President of BJP Uttarakhand from Vikasnagar, Uttarakhand.  He is also an ex Member of Uttarakhand Legislative Assembly (2009–12).

Early life
Kuldeep Kumar was born in Mandi district of Himachal Pradesh. He is the son of Santram and Laxmi Devi.

Political career
Kuldeep Kumar is an Indian Politician from Bhartiya Janata Party currently serving as the State General Secretary of Uttarakhand from Vikasnagar, Uttarakhand. He is also an ex Member of Uttarakhand Legislative Assembly (2009–12). He has been politically and socially active for a very long time. He was the Secretary Bar Association in Vikasnagar from 2002 to 2003, District President (2002-04) then State General Secretary (2004–07) of Hindu Jagran Manch and Member of District Panchayat (2003–07) in Bulakiwala. From 2007 to 2009 he served as the State General Secretary of Bharatiya Janata Yuva Morcha (BJYM). It was in 2009 when he was elected as the member of Uttarakhand Legislative Assembly. From 2015 to 2020 he also served as the Minister of BJP [Uttarakhand].And he was also  State general secretary Of Uttarakhand from 2020 to 2022

Member of Legislative Assembly (2009 - 2012)
 he is an elected member of the 2nd Uttarakhand Legislative Assembly.

Committee assignments of  Uttarakhand  Legislative Assembly 
 Member (2009- 2012), Committee on Estimates

Personal life 
Kuldeep Kumar is married to Anamika and is father of two kids, namely Akshat and Anshika.

References

People from Mandi district
Living people
1950 births
Bharatiya Janata Party politicians from Uttarakhand
Members of the Uttarakhand Legislative Assembly